is a Japanese singer-songwriter and composer. Throughout the early 2000s, Trio performed as a musician and producer, contributing to various albums and live shows under his birth name  before releasing his first self-produced album Pretaporter in 2007. His debut on Avex Group's Rhythm Zone, I Got Rhythm? (2009) topped the iTunes Store's albums chart. Throughout his career, he has released eighteen studio albums, seven singles and composed for multiple films.

Discography

As Yoshinori Ohashi

Studio albums

Soundtrack

Guest appearances

As Ohashi Trio

Studio albums

Live albums

Cover albums

Compilation albums

Singles

Guest appearances

References

External links

1978 births
Japanese composers
Japanese male composers
Japanese male pianists
Japanese male singer-songwriters
Japanese pianists
Japanese singer-songwriters
Living people